Qaleh Qazi District is a district (bakhsh) in Bandar Abbas County, Hormozgan Province, Iran. At the 2006 census, its population was 17,195, with 3,763 families.  The District has one city Qaleh Qazi. The District has two rural districts (dehestan): Qaleh Qazi Rural District and Sarkhun Rural District.

References 

Districts of Hormozgan Province
Bandar Abbas County